Bowden,  originally known as Taneha, is an unincorporated community in Creek County, Oklahoma, United States. It is located four miles north of Sapulpa, and is bisected by 433rd West Avenue and West 41st St. South. A post office operated in Bowden from June 9, 1909 to November 1, 1957. The community was named after Sapulpa merchant Rollandus A. Bowden. It developed as a boom town after the discovery of the Glenn Pool Oil Reserve. but today is a small town with approximately 225 people.

References

Unincorporated communities in Creek County, Oklahoma
Unincorporated communities in Oklahoma